Mavlan ماولان, also Romanized as Mavlān and Mawlān) is a village in Mavlan Rural District, in the Central District of Kaleybar County, East Azerbaijan Province, Iran. At the 2006 census, its population was 1,054, in 273 families.

References 

Populated places in Kaleybar County